Billings Clinic is a health care center based in Billings, Montana. It provides primary and specialty care  at Billings Clinic downtown (its main campus), Billings Clinic Heights, and Billings Clinic West, and numerous affiliate locations in Big Timber, Bozeman, Colstrip, Columbus, Glendive, Harlowton, Lewistown, Livingston, Miles City, Red Lodge, Roundup, and Scobey, Montana, as well as Cody, Lovell, and Sheridan, Wyoming.

Billings Clinic Hospital is a 304-bed hospital which includes a 20-suite family birth center, a 15-bed transitional care unit, and a Level II trauma center.

History 
The Billings Clinic was founded by Dr. Arthur J. Movius, who started his Billings medical practice in 1911. In 1915, after practicing on his own, Movius had Dr. J.H. Bridenbaugh join him as an assistant. Bridenbaugh operated and managed obstetrics and began working with a ground-breaking device, the x-ray machine. During World War I, Bridenbaugh joined the military, where he received training in radiology. After returning from the war, Bridenbaugh incorporated diagnostic x-rays and radiation therapy into his practice.

By 1930, five other physicians joined Movius and Bridenbaugh, forming  the Movius-Bridenbaugh Clinic, which specialized in obstetrics, fractures, and trauma. In 1939, the clinic conceived a plan to recruit new physicians as partners of the hospital, changing the name to The Billings Clinic. Construction began on a new clinic across the street from Billings Deaconess Hospital in 1950.

In 2013, The Billings Clinic joined the Mayo Clinic Care Network, a collaboration between Mayo Clinic and other health organizations to allow those organizations to access Mayo's clinical expertise. In 2009, the Billings Clinic opened a cancer center, at a cost of $31.9-million. The same year, an outpatient surgery center opened.

Graduate medical education
In 2013, Billings Clinic established an internal medicine residency. The program is accredited by the Accreditation Council for Graduate Medical Education.

Beginning July 2021, Billings Clinic began educating psychiatry residents from the University of Washington. The cooperative program has resident physicians begin their first two years of residency in Seattle with the University of Washington and the latter two years of their residency training with the Billings Clinic.

See also 
 List of hospitals in Montana

References

External links 
 Billings Clinic

Hospital networks in the United States
Healthcare in Montana
Medical and health organizations based in Montana
1927 establishments in Montana
Trauma centers